Carlos Tramutolo (17 March 1925 – 9 July 2013) was an Uruguayan cyclist. He competed in the time trial event at the 1948 Summer Olympics.

References

External links
 

1925 births
2013 deaths
Uruguayan male cyclists
Olympic cyclists of Uruguay
Cyclists at the 1948 Summer Olympics
Sportspeople from Montevideo